North Sider (foaled in 1982) was an American Thoroughbred racehorse who was voted an Eclipse Award as the American Champion Older Female Horse of 1987.

References
 North Sider's pedigree and partial racing stats

1982 racehorse births
Racehorses bred in Kentucky
Racehorses trained in the United States
Eclipse Award winners
Thoroughbred family 1-c